Federal Route 10 is a federal road in Pahang and Negeri Sembilan, Malaysia. It connects Temerloh, Pahang in the north to Gemas, Negeri Sembilan in the south.

The Kilometre Zero is located at Gemas, Negeri Sembilan, at its interchange with the Federal Route 1, the main trunk road of the central of Peninsular Malaysia.

Features

Roads along Pahang River between Temerloh and Mengkarak
Sungai Lui Japanese War Memorial

At most sections, the Federal Route 10 was built under the JKR R5 road standard, with a speed limit of 90 km/h.

List of junctions and towns

References

010